Dicrodon guttulatum, the Peru desert tegu , is a species of teiid lizard found in Ecuador and Peru. It is herbivorous, with Prosopis pallida making up the majority of its diet.

References

Dicrodon
Reptiles described in 1839
Taxa named by André Marie Constant Duméril
Taxa named by Gabriel Bibron